The God Equation: The Quest for a Theory of Everything is a popular science book by the futurist and physicist Michio Kaku. The book was initially published on April 6, 2021 by Doubleday.

The book debuted at number six on The New York Times nonfiction best-seller list for the week ending April 10, 2021.

Overview
Kaku explores the history of unification theories of physics starting with Newton's law of universal gravitation which unified our experience of gravity on Earth and the motions of the celestial bodies to Einstein's general relativity and quantum mechanics and the Standard Model. He dubs the final Grand Unified Theory of relativity and quantum gravity The God Equation with an 11-dimensional string theory as the only self-consistent theory that seems to fit the bill.

References

2021 non-fiction books
Books by Michio Kaku
Popular science books
Doubleday (publisher) books